Tanushree Debbarma is the first woman Indian Administrative Service (IAS) officer in Tripura, India. She was the first woman from Tripura to pass the IAS exam. She secured fourth place in the civil service examination in the ST category in 2006.  She studied at the Indian Institute of Technology Delhi and received an offer from a multi-national IT firm but turned it down to prepare for the Civil Services Examination IAS exam. 

Debbarma was in the Government of Karnataka until 2020 as the Director of Tribal Welfare with additional roles of Director of Elementary Education and State Project Director, National Education Mission (Samagra Shiksha Abhiyan). She has now been transferred and appointed secretary to the Government of Tripura.

She now holds the additional posts of Secretary of Industries and Commerce (Information and Technology) and member of Tripura Sales Tax Tribunal and VAT Tribunal in the state administration of the of Tripura. During the COVID-19 Pandemic lockdown, she was one of the official from Govt. Of Tripura engaged in bring back people stranded in other states.

References 

Civil Services of India
Women from Tripura
Living people
IIT Delhi
Tripuri people
Government of Tripura
Year of birth missing (living people)